Class Dismissed is a British children's sketch comedy series created by Luke Beddows, Stephen M. Collins and Andy Potter. The series is produced by CBBC Productions and has run from 2016. The show has aired 6 series, with the first starting on 1 February 2016, a second series starting on 5 December 2016, a third on 27 November 2017, a fourth on 11 March 2019, a fifth sometime in mid-2019 and a sixth on 29 November 2021.

The series follows 'a school day at the fictional Dockbridge High, (in Series 4, 5 and 6 it focusses on Quayside Academy) where 'nothing out of the ordinary ever happens' – unless you count the stunt diving supply teachers, explosive science classes and hazardous baked bean moments!'.

The show features an ensemble cast, similar to Horrible Histories currently consisting of Richard David-Caine, Vivienne Acheampong, Jason Forbes, Greig Johnson, Steven Kynman, Suhk Ojla, Luke McQueen, Kat Bond and Denise Welch and formerly Sophie Willan, Marvyn Dickinson, Thomas Nelstrop, Dan Starkey, Ellie White, Jamie Rose-Monk, Naga Munchetty, Susan Harrison, Sam Battersea, Velile Tshabalala, Harvey Virdi and Marie Lawrence. It was originally filmed at St Anne's R.C. High School, Stockport.

In series 4 in March 2019, the series relocated to Quayside Academy with an almost entirely new cast other than David-Caine and narrator Turnbull. The series consisted of 10 episodes. Series 5 and 6 were filmed at Manchester Health Academy.

Production
Class Dismissed was first announced in 2014, as part of CBBC's 2015 commissions, despite not airing until 2016. 12 episodes were ordered. A second series of 12 episodes was announced as part of CBBC's 2016 commissions. CBBC joined with BBC Writersroom to find sketch writers for series one and did this again for series two. Series 2 began on 5 December 2016. Series 3 began on 27 November 2017. Series 4 began on 11 March 2019, Series 5, sometime in mid 2019 and Series 6 on 29 November 2021.

Child cast

Lead 
Charleigh Brierley (Series 4–5) as Charleigh. Charleigh is slightly weirder than her friends. She aspires to be a DJ but still dislikes Mr Bishop, especially his “silly” jingles. She often falls for Miss Crank's pranks and out of the four she's the most tolerant of the teachers but still gets annoyed by them.
Connor Elliott (Series 4–5) as Connor. Connor dislikes school the most of the four and is baffled by Warren's obsession with it. He can often predict how a lesson will end in disaster. There isn't a subject he enjoys.
Alexcia Farquarson (Series 4–5) as Alexcia. The cleverest of the four who often tries to ignore her teachers. Mr Christopher nicknames her F minus and often tells her she has no talent.
Hakeem Khan (Series 4–5) as Hakeem. Hakeem is often making sarcastic quips about the teachers who really get on his nerves and can often be found joking around with his friends.
Charleigh Adams (Series 1–3,5) as Emily. Emily is a sensible girl who is often on the receiving end of the teachers' eccentricities. Her excellent art work is consistently ruined by Miss Flip while Mr Nasal regularly sneezes over her. She returned in a brief guest appearance for the final episode of Series 5, as well as in Flunked!
Billy Holland (Series 1–3,5) as Billy. Billy doesn't take school very seriously and enjoys gently baiting his teachers. He returned in a brief guest appearance for the final episode of Series 5, as well as in Flunked!
Tahj Miles (Series 1–3,5) as Tahj. Tahj is the brightest and most eager to learn of the students. He does find the incompetence and silliness of some of his teacher such as Miss Franks and Mr Capp frustrating. He is usually found giving advice to Mr Konnundrum. He returned in a brief guest appearance for the final episode of Series 5, as well as in Flunked!
Chanelle Thompson (Series 1–3,5) as Jasmine. Jasmine is a bright student but occasionally pushes the boundaries. She returned in a brief guest appearance for the final episode of Series 5, as well as in Flunked!
Thomas O'Toole (Series 6) as Nick. Nick is Year 7's cool kid and pretty cheeky. He's often to be found in the canteen, excited by Miss Chelin's dish of the day, but is normally left disappointed by the final result.
Amira Macey-Michael (Series 6) as Imani. Imani is Year 7's teacher's pet. She is always perfectly turned out and very studious. 
Danny Shoesmith (Series 6) as Oli. He is the class clown, constantly dodging “Double Detentions” from the BFF headteachers as he searches for illicit sweets!
Marlis Robson (Series 6) as Grace. Grace is full of enthusiasm and likes to be involved with all the action. She learns best in practical lessons but at Quayside Academy these often end up messy!

Additional 
Ethan Proops (Series 1–3,5) as Martin. Martin is unquestionably the oddest of the students. He always seems to enjoy his teachers' antics including the ones who annoy the students the most such as Mr Capp, Mr Christopher and Miss Fun-With-Numbers, being the first to join in when the class is asked. He returned in a brief guest appearance for the final episode of Series 5 in which it was revealed that Martin continued to work for Mr Christopher when he left school as his personal assistant and doesn't get paid by him.
Emily Su (Series 2–3) as Mollie. Mollie contributes a few lines but her character is less well-developed than the other students. Mrs Stein likes to throw food at her to her dismay.
Shine Dosunmua (Series 5) as Shine. Kelly's son who she is constantly fussing over and treating him like a baby. She nicknames him Boo-Boo Bear. The other students like to laugh at his embarrassing situation.

Overview

Adult cast

The cast consisted of Richard David-Caine, Vivienne Acheampong, Jason Forbes, Greig Johnson, Steven Kynman and Kat Bond, Steve McQueen, Selom Awadzi and Denise Welch (who all joined in Series 5). Sophie Willan appeared in Series 4 but did not return in Series 5. Only Johnson and Bond returned for Series 6, with an all-new cast joining them. Evan Davis made a guest appearance in one episode. As well as the characters listed below, the main adult cast also make appearances as other minor characters.

Quayside cast
{| class="wikitable sortable" style="width:50;"
|-
!scope="col" | Starring Actor
!scope="col" | Roles 
|-
!scope="row"| Richard David-Caine (Series 1- 5)
|Quayside Characters

Mr Gangle (Series 4–5) A P.E. teacher lives up to his surname with his gangly appearance and who is completely physically uncoordinated and easily confused, often leading to him confusing his students as well.

Mr Nasal - (Series 1–2, 4) Mr Nasal has a grotesque and filthy appearance. He has a huge nose and regularly sneezes thick and foul mucus, often over the unfortunate Emily or over food or students’ books. He has a romance with the equally physically repulsive (but more likeable) lab technician Miss Spray whom he marries at the end of Series 2 after which they both leave. He returned for Series 4 in which it was revealed that he and Miss Spray had a baby who shares his father's disgusting habit. He didn't return for Series 5.

Gary Stern (Series 4) The head of discipline at Quayside Academy. He bears a strong resemblance to Jeremy Kyle and disciplines students as if it were The Jeremy Kyle Show. He didn't return in Series 5 (likely due to The Jeremy Kyle Show being cancelled).

Mr Christopher - (Series 1–5) Mr. Christopher is a very camp and self-obsessed music and dance teacher with a deluded sense of his own skills as a performer. Even during a written exam he finds it impossible to keep quiet and he always wishes to steal the show. In Series 2 he is promoted to Head of Arts ("not including actual Art"). He has made two songs which have been used in the show's credits. Martin was the only member of his ‘entourage’, the other students being distinctly unimpressed with his abilities. In Series 4 (now set at Quayside Academy) he became a drama teacher and Mr Bishop took the role of music teacher. He left at the end of Series 5 to pursue a career in television. The final episode of series 5 is a retrospective of his life. He is convinced that his pupils have absolutely no talent, particularly Alexcia whom he nicknames F minus.

'Dockbridge Characters

Mark - (Series 1–3) Although in Year 8 Mark is far taller than his fellow students. However his behaviour is anything but mature and he shows no interest in working even though his mother (Mrs. Mark) is his form teacher. Indeed, Mark is constantly embarrassed by the idea his mother being his teacher and insists "She's not my mum!" He returned in Flunked!Mrs. Mark - (Series 1–3) A form tutor who teaches her son, Mark. Although she claims to treat all students fairly she blatantly favours Mark, always giving him "Pupil of the Week" and punishing other pupils for his wrongdoing. She was inspired to become a teacher by Granny Mark, who is her mum. She then used Mark's catchphrase "she’s not my mum" to refer to Granny Mark.

Marcella - (Series 2–3) A mean Year 13 girl whom Mark has a crush on. She often uses stereotypical teenage expressions and slang. She returned in Flunked!Juan Castenetta - (Series 2–3) A Spanish teacher who teaches Spanish through gestures and mannerisms rather than the actual Spanish language.
 
Mr Ladd - (Series 2) A briefly-seen, "cool" supply teacher who likes to break rules and do parkour rather than actually teach. Mr Capp admires him but Mr Ladd tries to lure him into trouble.

|-
!scope="row"| Vivienne Acheampong (Series 4–5)
| Miss Scandal - (Series 4–5) An English teacher who seems to prefer having a gossip with the class to actually teaching the lesson! However her gossipy tales do have a learning value as they are actually based on characters or events from literature.

Miss Stuart - (Series 4) A Geography teacher with a PhD in fun! Every time a member of her class says that they are bored she breaks out into song to "make sure they are having fun". However her elaborate efforts fail to catch their imaginations. She left after one series.

The Amazing Anita - (Series 5) A Spanish teacher who used to be part of a magic act called Juan and the Amazing Anita. She gets her class to recite things in Spanish while she performs magic tricks which usually go wrong.

Kelly (Series 5) An extremely embarrassing mother who is obsessed with her son whom she nicknames Boo-Boo Bear and makes up excuses to visit him during the day. She is constantly hugging and kissing him and squeezing his cheeks.
|-
!scope="row"|Jason Forbes (Series 4–5)
| Mr Endzone (Series 4) American football coach turned head of year 8. Students come to him for help but he tells them stories from his younger days which have no relevance to their situation. He encourages them to "Go Long!" Every time he throws an American football, it seems to make a crash. He didn't return the following series.

Mr Vista (Series 4) An art teacher whose drawings seem to get a little destructive. Although the lessons start off happy, he then believes that something awful will happen to his world so starts messing up the picture. He only appeared in Series 4.

Mr Krill (Series 5) An  art teacher who is obsessed with Blue whales and gets annoyed if his students paint something other than a blue whale.

Nick (Series 5) One of the receptionists. He constantly interrupts Bunty with useless information that doesn't make sense.

Mr Keenan (Series 4–5) A fleetingly seen teacher who is always falling victim to some strange accident. When enquires follow he replies “don't ask”.

|-
!scope="row"| Greig Johnson (Series 4- present)
| Chris Bishop (Series 4–5) A denim-clad music teacher who teaches almost no music and sees himself as a wannabe radio DJ. He calls himself "Chris the Bish" and instead of making students put their hands up to answer questions, he makes them "Dial in to request a song".

Steven “Knight Hawk” Jenkins (Series 4–5) A P.E teacher who believes himself to be the "Night Hawk", a champion wrestler. He teaches the lesson as if it were a wrestling match, with loud music at the start for his entrance. He likes the students to call him by his nickname but they stick to calling him "Mr Jenkins".

Mr Alan (Series 4-) A Maths teacher who is slightly overenthusiastic about numbers, often singing songs and playing music about them. However his positive mood evaporates when he objects for no clear reason to a perfectly correct answer from one of the students and sends him or her out of the room. In Series 6 he returns from a mindfulness retreat but quits his job and is reassigned as school caretaker. He develops a rivalry with his replacement, Mr. Phillips, leading to a number-off.

Rolf Smorgasbord (Series 5-) The selfish, pompous and camp head of displays. He has a German accent. His displays are never very good. He often gets students to be part of his displays by dressing them up in costumes covering them in substances or getting them to stand still in a position all day. In Series 6 he takes on the position of Geography teacher, creating elaborate displays and scenarios to explain parts of his new subject.

Mr Gentley (Series 6) A mild-mannered, ginger-haired physical sciences teacher who, outside of teaching, is in a band called Scream Beast and performs heavy metal songs about the lesson's topic when the pupils get bored.

|-
!scope="row"|Steven Kynman (Series 4 - 5)
| "Chips" (real name Bobby) (Series 4) He is one of the school caretakers along with his partner "Chicken". Both once presented a children's TV comedy show but he is now world-weary and wants to put his comic past behind him. However he finds his attempts to take a serious approach to work are frustrated by her behaviour. He didn't return for Series 5.

Mr Goldman (Series 4–5) Headteacher of Quayside Academy. He takes his assemblies as if he were the CEO of a big technology company, calling himself "Teacher, Innovator" and can often be found with his less-than-helpful assistant Carol.

Mr Soleil (Series 4–5) He teaches French and wears an outfit of clashing colours and patterns. He is completely disrespected by his "assistant" Poppy whom he has to send out of the room in an unconvincing display of authority. He likes to think that he's strict and serious but he's anything but.

Mr Carroll (Series 5) A geography teacher who acts and dresses like he's from Australia. Despite this he is one of the few teachers who knows what he's doing. Warren particularly like this class and always knows what Mr Carroll is going to say and knows all the answers.

Mr Spenge (Series 5) A very easily confused science teacher who is always getting his words muddled up and accidentally getting covered in sticky substances and getting stuck to things.

Mr James (Series 5) A secret agent who appears in one episode of Series 5 in which he goes undercover as a supply teacher, taking over French for Mr Soliel, and mistakes Connor for a fellow secret agent.

|-
!scope="row"| Sukh Ojla (Series 4 - 5)
| "Chicken" (real name Charlotte) (Series 4) is one of the school caretakers along with her partner "Chips" (Bobby). The pair used to present a children's TV comedy show and it is clear she stills sees herself as a comedy character with her zany outfits and manner. Although he wants to take the job seriously she turns even the most basic task into a slapstick routine. She didn't return the following series.

Miss Crank (Series 4–5) A History teacher and prankster who always tries to "Crank" her class so she can post them on the internet. However, none of the students ever actually believe what she is saying so the Cranks don't work.

Poppy (Series 4–5) Poppy is supposed to be Mr Soleil's teaching assistant but her behaviour and attitude are far worse than any student.

Nadia Choudhry (Series 5) The lazy, Australian-accented, head of security who is constantly on the phone and shows no interest whatsoever in the student's problems, even if it's incredibly serious like the ceiling in the assembly hall falling down. Her catchphrase is “Oh No!” said in a sarcastic tone.

|-
!scope=“row”| Kat Bond (series 5 - present)
| Linda (Series 5-) Linda was hired at the start of Series 5 as Mr Goldman's new assistant. She is almost identical to his previous assistant Carol and is very, very clumsy and forgetful. Mr Goldman sometimes mistakes her for Carol. In Series 6 she has anew role as Front of House Executive Solutions, which she isn't much better at than her previous job.

Mrs Aviary (Series 5-) A reptile obsessed biology teacher who often lets her pets loose in the school. In series 6 she becomes a survivalist and begins camping on the school grounds as well as teaching her pupils gross ways to save the planet. She debuted in Series 4 as a supply teacher, played by Sophie Willan.

Dame Margo Chichester (Series 5-) The drama teacher who takes Mr Christopher's place. She gets her students to act as nursery rhyme characters and goes to extreme lengths to make them act the part. I. Series 6 she is no longer nursery rhyme obsessed and is characterised by a bald head and a wig that often falls of.

Joanna Clearwater (Series 5) A broadcaster who reports on Mr Krill's art classes and is obsessed with blue whales.

Bunty (Series 5) One of the receptionists at Quayside Academy who interviews everyone who comes through reception such as delivery drivers. She is constantly interrupted by Nick.

|-
!scope=“row”|Selom Awadzi (Series 5)
| Warren (Series 5) An adult who is obsessed with Year 9 and has asked to be kept back a year 12 times in a row. He still wears the same uniform as he did back when he first started Year 9.
 
|-
!scope=“row”|Luke McQueen (Series 5)
| Freddie Bowditch-Bentley (Series 5) A self-obsessed art teacher who gets his pupils to draw pictures of himself at big events surrounded by celebrities admiring him. He loves all of their pictures, even if they're bad because they're of him. If he sees one which he thinks has made him look exceptionally handsome he dances around the room with it, gets carried away with himself and dances his way out of the room.

Mr Chakra (Series 5) A man who teaches yoga and his constantly breaking wind but blames it on other people. He
speaks in a sing-song voice.
|-
!scope=“row”|Denise Welch (Series 5)
| Chief Inspector Pam Travers (Series 5-) A police officer turned lollipop lady who takes her job far too seriously.

|-
!scope="row"|Sophie Willan           (Series 4)
| Carol (Series 4) Mr Goldman's assistant who tries to help him but she is totally disorganised and her attempt at even the simplest task such as making coffee ends in chaos. There are well-founded rumours that she and Mr Goldman are a couple. These were confirmed in Series 5  but she dumped him by text and she was replaced by the equally disorganised Linda.

|-
!scope=“row”|Chiara Goldsmith and Róisin O’Mahony (Series 6)
| Miss Bianca Fopp-Fort and Miss Bridget Fair-Fleet (Series 6) The new headmistresses of Quayside Academy who are very girly and childish and do everything together. They run the school together and can often be found chanting about their friendship.

Miss Chelin and Marlowe (Series 6) Experimental food artist, Miss Chelin and her moustachioed assistant Marlowe have been appointed to run the canteen by the new Headmistresses who found them on Instagram. They have very peculiar methods of preparing and serving food. They're catchphrase is experience.

Mr. Turtalli and Nancy (Series 6) Mr. Turtalli teaches Italian and has brought his beloved wife, Nancy into school to be his teaching assistant. They always find a way to relate the lesson to their relationship, eventually forgetting about it altogether and embarrassing their pupils with their romantic scenarios before asking them to have a lengthy amount of homework homework on their desk by Friday.

|-
!scope=“row”|Ali Kahn (Series 6)
| Dr. Ola Markov (Series 6) The school's new Russian-accented head of technology who creates inventions trying to change the habits of today's youth. She thinks she's very cool and mocks her pupils, even though her inventions always end in chaos and/or disaster.

Mr. Kettering (Series 6) A business mogul who now teaches home economics, using his lessons as a chance to make some money, whether that's by setting up a fast-food service or a wedding-cake making business. He puts his students under a lot of pressure and speaks with a cockney accent.

|- 
!scope=“row”|Shiv Rabheru (Series 6)
| Mr. J.C.B Dahling (Series 6) A conceited self-published author and English teacher whose books are clear rip-offs of other books. He thinks classic works of literature are rubbish and has very strange ways of teaching about story writing.

Mr. Phillips (Series 6) An American former special services officer who creates elaborate scenarios to show the importance of maths. He develops a rivalry with Mr. Alan and Linda has a bit of a crush on him. His catchphrase is “Math Saves Lives!”

|}

There are also four canteen assistants who wear red and white striped jackets and hats and have curly moustaches. They sing about their menu in the style of a barbershop quartet but find none of the students interested in buying. In Series 4 these characters were played by Richard David-Caine, Steven Kynman, Greig Johnson and Jason Forbes. In Series 5 Luke McQueen replaced Richard David-Caine in the group.

Dockbridge cast

The cast originally consisted of Richard David-Caine, Harvey Virdi, Jamie-Rose Monk, Marie Lawrence, Sam Battersea, Velile Tshabalala, Dan Starkey, Thomas Nelstrop and Marvyn Dickinson. Lawrence left after Series 1 while Ellie White and Susan Harrison joined the cast. Velile Tshabalala and Harvey Virdi left after Series 2. Naga Munchetty joined the cast in Series 3, making regular guest appearances. Other guest stars have included Fred Sirieix, playing himself, and Arthur Bostrom, playing Monsieur Artois, a supply teacher whose English isn't very good.

Episodes

Series 1 (2016)

Series 2 (2016)

Series 3 (2017)

 Spin-off Flunked!, a one-off 17 minute continuation of the Dockbridge High story follows Emily, Billy, Tahj, Jasmine and Mark as they join the sixth form. It premiered on 8 February 2019.

In other media
Richard David-Caine's characters 'Mark' and 'Mrs Mark' appear in David-Caine and Joseph Elliott's web sketch show InterNOT''. Mark appears filming videos whilst his mum interrupts him.

References

External links
 

2016 British television series debuts
2010s British children's television series
2010s high school television series
2020s British children's television series
2020s high school television series
English-language television shows
CBBC shows
BBC children's television shows
British children's comedy television series
British high school television series
Children's sketch comedy
BBC television sketch shows
Television series about children